Saint Bononio (or Bononius) (died  August 30, 1026) was a Benedictine abbot and saint of the Catholic Church.

Bononio was born in Bologna sometime in the latter part of the tenth century. He became a monk at an early age, and while on a pilgrimage to the East settled in Egypt to live as a hermit during the reign of Fatamid Caliph Al-Aziz Billah. Noted for both his asceticism and charitable works, Bononio acquired some influence at court, and was permitted to build a few churches.  When Peter, bishop of Vercelli, was captured by Arab forces after the Battle of Stilo, Bononio assisted in the bishop's release, and then retired to live as a hermit in the Sinai.

In gratitude for Bononio's assistance, when Peter returned to Italy, he named him abbot of the monastery of Lucedio.  At Lucedio, Bononio restored discipline amongst the monks and provided for the surrounding population. He died in Lucedio on August 30, 1026. Bononio was canonized by Pope John XIX. The saint's festival is celebrated on that day in the Piedmont liturgical calendar. The village of San Bononio is part of the municipality of Curino. It celebrates its patron's feast with a three-day festival of concerts, art exhibitions, and lanterns on the canal.

The story that Bononio was a disciple of Saint Romuald is based on a much later spurious vita fabricated by a Camaldolese abbot.

References

External links
St. Bononius

Italian Roman Catholic saints
1026 deaths
Italian hermits
Egyptian hermits
Clergy from Bologna
Italian Benedictines
11th-century Italian clergy
11th-century Christian saints
Year of birth unknown
Lucedio Abbey